Anna Vilhelmina Alm was a Swedish editor and author. Alm wrote several books and edited an independent Church of Sweden parish journal, .

Biography 
The newspaper began as an insert for the Swedish newspaper Vårt Land but in 1904 became an independent publication, and dealt mostly with parish affairs. She remained in this position until 1918.

Anna and Carl Alm are buried together at the Norra begravningsplatsen in Stockholm.

References

 
1862 births
1958 deaths
20th-century Swedish women writers
Writers from Stockholm
Burials at Norra begravningsplatsen